Nemzeti Bajnokság III (NBIII, National Championship III) is the third tier of Hungarian football (from the autumn of 1997 till the spring of 2005, NB III was the fourth tier, the third was NB II). 
The tier contains 3 groups (west, center, east) of 16 teams. From each group, the champions are promoted to the NB II. The three lowest teams are relegated to the first tier of local divisions (Megye I.). From NB II, the three lowest teams are relegated to NB III.

Groups
Eastern-group
Central-group
Western-group

List of champions

Regional classification

Tripartite classification

Notes
 Note 1: In the 2015-16 Nemzeti Bajnokság III season Ferencvárosi TC II won the championship (West). However, they were not promoted, instead Mosonmagyaróvár and Dorog were promoted. SZEOL SC (Centre) were also promoted along with the champions Kozármisleny. Cegléd and Cigánd were also promoted from the East group along with the champions Nyíregyháza.
 Note 2:The championship was abandoned due to the COVID-19 pandemic.
 Note 3: Although Érdi VSE finished first, they did not have the financial background to participate in the 2020-21 Nemzeti Bajnokság II season. Therefore, Szentlőrinci SE from the centre group were promoted.
 Note 4: Although Iváncsa KSE won the 2020-21 season, Kecskeméti TE were promoted.

See also
Nemzeti Bajnokság I
Nemzeti Bajnokság II

References 

 
3
Hun
Professional sports leagues in Hungary